is a private university in Ashikaga, Tochigi, Japan, established in 1967.

External links

 Official website 

Educational institutions established in 1967
Private universities and colleges in Japan
Universities and colleges in Tochigi Prefecture
Engineering universities and colleges in Japan
1967 establishments in Japan
Ashikaga, Tochigi